Air transportation in the Philippines goes back to the early days of aviation prior to World War II, during the American colonial period of the Philippines. Currently, the Philippines has several registered airline companies, but they are mostly chartered. There are two main domestic airline groups doing business as Philippine Airlines and Cebu Pacific, with AirAsia Philippines competing on some international routes. The domestic market is dominated by the Cebu Pacific group which has a 61% market share, followed by the Philippine Airlines group which has 29%, followed by AirAsia, having a 9% share.

This list of airlines enumerates local airlines in the Philippines which have a current air operator's certificate issued by the Civil Aviation Authority.

Note: Destinations in bold indicate primary hubs, those in italic indicate secondary hubs, while those with regular font indicate focus cities.

Scheduled airlines

Mainline

Regional

Charter airlines

Cargo airlines

See also
Lists of airlines
List of airlines of Asia
List of defunct airlines of the Philippines 
List of airports in the Philippines

Philippines
Lists of companies of the Philippines
Philippines transportation-related lists
Philippines